Yvignac-la-Tour is a commune in the Côtes-d'Armor department of the region in Brittany in northwestern France.

The church
One of Yvignac's most prominent landmarks, reflected in the town's name, is the tall tower of its church. This tower is not a steeple, tapering to a point, but has a flat roof. Also inside the church at the back entrance is a large old coffin, and a wall. This wall is split into three sections, the top sowing a grail, possibly being the Holy Grail. The bottom left is a shield and sword, on the shield is a cross, this could be a major artifact, we know that this could point to the Knights Templars. the last bit of the shield was faded.

Population

The inhabitants of Yvignac-la-Tour are known in French as yvignacais.

International relations
It is twinned with the town of Ivenack in Germany.

See also
Communes of the Côtes-d'Armor department

References

External links

Communes of Côtes-d'Armor